Jean-Felix Nourrisson (18 July 1825 – 13 June 1899) was a nineteenth-century French Catholic philosopher.

Publications 
 Essai sur la philosophie de Bossuet (1852)
 Le Cardinal de Bérulle, sa vie, ses écrits, son temps (1856)
 Les Pères de l'Église latine, leur vie, leurs écrits, leur temps (2 volumes, 1856)
 Exposition de la théorie platonicienne des idées (1858)
 Tableau des progrès de la pensée humaine depuis Thalès jusqu'à Leibniz (1858)
 Histoire et philosophie, portraits et études (1863)
 La Philosophie de Leibniz (1860)
 Le XVIIIe siècle et la Révolution française (1863)
 La Philosophie de saint Augustin (1865)
 La Nature humaine, essais de psychologie appliquée (1865)
 Spinoza et le Naturalisme contemporain (1866)
 La Politique de Bossuet (1867)
 De la liberté et du hasard, essai sur Alexandre d'Aphrodisias (1870)
 Machiavel (1874)
 Pascal physicien et philosophe (1885)
 Trois révolutionnaires : Turgot, Necker, Bailly (1885)
 Philosophie de la nature, Bacon, Beyle, Toland, Buffon (1887)
 Voltaire et le voltairianisme (1896)
 Rousseau et le rousseauisme (1904)

References

19th-century French philosophers
Members of the Académie des sciences morales et politiques
Collège Stanislas de Paris alumni
French Roman Catholics
1825 births
1899 deaths
French male non-fiction writers
People from Thiers